Gérard Hamel (born February 21, 1945 in Sourdun, Seine-et-Marne) was a member of the National Assembly of France.  He represented Eure-et-Loir's 2nd constituency from 1993 to 2012 as a member of the Union for a Popular Movement.

References

1945 births
Living people
People from Seine-et-Marne
Politicians from Île-de-France
Rally for the Republic politicians
Union for a Popular Movement politicians
Debout la France politicians
Deputies of the 10th National Assembly of the French Fifth Republic
Deputies of the 11th National Assembly of the French Fifth Republic
Deputies of the 12th National Assembly of the French Fifth Republic
Deputies of the 13th National Assembly of the French Fifth Republic
Mayors of places in Centre-Val de Loire